Nudaria mollis is a moth of the subfamily Arctiinae first described by Thomas Pennington Lucas in 1894. It is found in Queensland, Australia.

References

Nudariina